Malin Crépin (born 22 August 1978, in Stockholm), is a Swedish actress. She has starred in several movies. She became best known for her role in the Swedish film series A Case for Annika Bengtzon.

Life and career 
Malin Crépin was born in Stockholm in 1978. From 1998 to 2002, she received her training at the Malmö Theatre Academy. Since then, she has been active in the Stockholm City Theatre and at the Swedish National Theater, in Stockholm..

Crépin has also played in films and television series.  Crépin embodied in 2012, the main role of the journalist Annika Bengtzon from the books by the Swedish novelist Liza Marklund.

Awards 
2008: Rising Star Award for Best Newcomer of the Year at the Stockholm International Film Festival
2010: Nominated for the Guldbagge Award for Best Actress in the film In Your Veins

Filmography 
 2003: Assistanten (short movie)
 2003: Miffo, as Anna
 2005: Lasermannen, as Annika
 2007: Upp till kamp (TV miniseries), as Nina
 2009: In Your Veins as Eva (I skuggan av värmen) together with Joel Kinnaman
 2010: Cornelis, as Ingalill Rehnberg
 2010: Kommissarie Winter - Den sista vinter (TV movie), as Gerda Hoffner
 2011: Oslo, August 31st (Oslo, 31. august), as Malin
 2011: Människor helt utan betydelse (short movie)
 2012: Kiruna-Kigali (short movie), as Nina 
 2012: Annika Bengtzon – Nobel's Last Will
 2012: Annika Bengtzon – Prime Time (TV movie)
 2012: Annika Bengtzon - Studio Sex (TV movie)
 2012: Annika Bengtzon - Den röda vargen (TV movie)
 2012: Annika Bengtzon – Livstid (TV movie)
 2012: Annika Bengtzon - En plats i solen (TV movie)
 2014: Lulu (short movie) as Lulu
 2015: Nylon (short movie), as Isabel
 2016: The Medium, as Martha
 2016: Sameblod (Sami Blood)
 2022: Don't Look at the Demon, as Martha

Theater 
 2000: Ben Elton's Popcorn
 2002: Arthur Miller's Utiskt Från En Bro (A View From A Bridge)
 2002: Petra Berg-Holbeck's Starck
 2004: Shakespeare's A Midsummer´s Night Dream 
 2005: Aldous Huxley's En Helskön Ny Värld (A Brave New World)
 2006: Lars Norén's Terminal
 2006: Henrik Ibsen's Little Eyolf
 2008: Jean Genet's Jungfruleken (The Maids)
 2008: Lars Norén's A La Mémoire Dánna Politkovskaia
 2008: Jez Butterworth's Överwintrare (The Winterling)
 2016: Rona Munro's The James Plays

References

External links 

Interview mit Malin Crépin in: SBS
Filmography in The New York Times

Swedish stage actresses
1978 births
Swedish film actresses
Swedish television actresses
Living people
Actresses from Stockholm
21st-century Swedish actresses
20th-century Swedish actresses